Ezāfe , also romanized as ezâfe, izafet, izafe, izafat, izāfa, ezafe, and izofa, is a grammatical particle found in some Iranian languages, as well as Persian-influenced languages such as Turkish and Hindustani, that links two words together. In the Persian language, it consists of the unstressed short vowel -e or -i (-ye or -yi after vowels) between the words it connects and often approximately corresponds in usage to the English preposition of. It is generally not indicated in writing in the Persian script, which is normally written without short vowels, but it is indicated in Tajiki, which is written in the Cyrillic script, as -и without a hyphen.

Ezafe in Persian
Common uses of the Persian ezafe are:
Possessive:   "Maryam's brother" (it can also apply to pronominal possession,   "my brother", but in speech it is much more common to use possessive suffixes).
Adjective-noun:   "the big brother".
Given name/title-family name:  ,   "Mr. Mosaddeq"
Linking two nouns:   "Tehran Street" or "Road to Tehran"
After final long vowels (  or  ) in words, the ezâfe is marked by a  intervening before the ezâfe ending.

The Persian grammatical term ezâfe is borrowed from the Arabic concept of iḍāfa ("addition"), where it denotes a genitive construction between two or more nouns, expressed using case endings. However, whereas the Iranian ezâfe denotes a grammatical particle (or even a pronoun), in Arabic, the word iḍāfa actually denotes the relationship between the two words. In Arabic, two words in an iḍāfa construction are said in English to be in possessed-possessor construction (where the possessed is in the construct state and any case, and the possessor is in the genitive case and any state).

In Hindustani
Iẓāfat in Urdu-Hindi is a syntactical construction of two nouns, where the first component is a determined noun, and the second is a determiner. This construction was borrowed from Persian. In Hindi-Urdu, a short vowel "i" is used to connect these two words, and when pronouncing the newly formed word the short vowel is connected to the first word.

In other languages

Besides Persian, ezafe is found in other Iranian languages and in Turkic languages, which have historically borrowed many phrases from Persian. Ottoman Turkish made extensive use of ezafe, borrowing it from Persian (the official name of the Ottoman Empire was  ), but it is transcribed as -i or -ı rather than -e. Ezafe is also used frequently in Hindustani, but its use is mostly restricted to poetic settings or to phrases imported wholesale from Persian since Hindustani expresses the genitive with the native declined possessive postposition kā. The title of the Bollywood film, Salaam-e-Ishq, is an example of the use of the ezafe in Hindustani. Other examples of ezafe in Hindustani include terms like  "death penalty" and  "praiseworthy".

The linking particle declines in accordance to the gender, definiteness, and number of the noun that precedes it. It is used in adjectival declension and forming the genitive:

  "The Boss' office" (The office of the boss)
  "In an adjacent office"
  "Outside his office" (The office of his)

Besides the above mentioned languages, ezafe is used in Kurdish in Syria, Iraq, Turkey and Iran:

Etymology
Originally, in Old Persian, nouns had case endings, just like every other early Indo-European language (such as Latin, Greek, and Proto-Germanic). A genitive construction would have looked much like an Arabic iḍāfa construct, with the first noun being in any case, and the second being in the genitive case, as in Arabic or Latin.
  "by the will of Auramazda"
  "will" (Instrumental case)
  "Ahura Mazda (God)" (genitive case)

 by the will which (is) of Auramazdah

Thus the phrase
  
historically means "man which (is) good" rather than "good man."

In other modern Iranian languages, such as Northern Kurdish, the ezafe particle is still a relative pronoun, which declines for gender and number. However, rather than translating it as "which," as its etymological origin suggests, a more accurate translation for the New Persian use of ezafe would be a linking genitive/attributive "of" or, in the case of adjectives, not translating it.

Since the ezafe is not typical of the Avestan language and most East Iranian languages, where the possessives and adjectives normally precede their head noun without a linker, an argument has been put forward that the ezafe construction ultimately represents a substrate feature, more specifically, an outcome of the Elamite influence on Old Persian, which followed the Iranian migration to the territories previously inhabited by the Elamites.

See also
 Nominative case
 Oblique case
 Iḍāfah (Arabic's construct case)

Notes

References
 
 
 
 
 
 
 
 
Persian grammar
Ottoman Turkish language
Urdu